Herbert Ladd Jones (January 9, 1858 – December 9, 1921) was a Canadian politician.

Early life and education
Born in Weymouth, Nova Scotia, the son of St. Clair Jones and Helen Ladd, Jones was educated at the schools in Weymouth and the Collegiate Institute in  Fredericton, graduating in 1875.

Career
He then worked with his father for a time, and, in 1888, entered into partnership with his brothers, carrying on business as general merchants, lumbermen and ship owners. He was elected to the House of Commons of Canada for Digby in the 1887 election held following the death of John Campbell. A Conservative, he was defeated in 1891.

Jones later became an insurance agent.

Personal life
In 1891, he married Kate Dickson Black. He was president of the Weymouth Amateur Athletic Association, secretary for the Weymouth Agricultural Society and was one of the governors for King's College.

Jones' great grandfather was Cereno Upham Jones, who served in the Nova Scotia assembly and as a judge in the Court of Common Pleas.

Electoral record

References 

 

This article incorporates text from The Canadian album: men of Canada, Vol. 4, a publication now in the public domain.

1858 births
1921 deaths
Conservative Party of Canada (1867–1942) MPs
Members of the House of Commons of Canada from Nova Scotia
People from Digby County, Nova Scotia